The 1978 Torneo Godó or Trofeo Conde de Godó was a men's tennis tournament that took place on outdoor clay courts at the Real Club de Tenis Barcelona in Barcelona, Catalonia in Spain. It was the 26th edition of the tournament and was part of the 1978 Grand Prix circuit. It was held from 9 October until 15 October 1978. Eighth-seeded Balázs Taróczy won the singles title.

Finals

Singles
 Balázs Taróczy defeated  Ilie Năstase 1–6, 7–5, 4–6, 6–3, 6–4
 It was Taróczy's 2nd singles title of the year and the 4th of his career.

Doubles
 Željko Franulović' /  Hans Gildemeister defeated  Jean-Louis Haillet /  Gilles Moretton 6–1, 6–4

References

External links
 ITF tournament edition details
 Official tournament website
 ATP tournament profile

Barcelona Open (tennis)
Torneo Godo
Torneo Godo
Torneo Godo